Kimi Sato (born 5 March 1949) is a Japanese composer.

Biography
She was born in Sendai where she studied with Yoshiro Irino and graduated from the Toko Gakuen School of Music in Tokyo. She continued her studies at the Paris Conservatory with Olivier Messiaen, graduating in 1978. She returned to Japan in 1981 and was awarded the Prix de Rome in 1984, becoming the first foreign recipient of the prize.

Works
Selected works include:
Espace (1974)
Aillerus... (1984)
le cadre blanc (1972)
Beyond Space, Sound (1976)
le blu du ciel (1977)

Further reading 
 Messiaen 2008 : Messiaen au Conservatoire : contributions du Conservatoire national supérieur de musique et de danse de Paris aux célébrations de la naissance d'Olivier Messiaen

References

1949 births
20th-century classical composers
20th-century Japanese composers
20th-century Japanese women musicians
20th-century women composers
21st-century classical composers
21st-century Japanese composers
21st-century Japanese women musicians
21st-century women composers
Japanese classical composers
Japanese women classical composers
Living people